The Messinia Football Clubs Association is part of the Greek Football Federation that includes football (soccer) teams in the Messenia regional unit.

History

Its first attempt to run their own football (soccer) union in Messinia happened with the running of the council in Kalamanta.  In 1929, the Patras FCA asked from the Greek Football Federation not to try to run their own union as it was known that the association was part of the union.

Information sources 

The MFCA which is headquartered in Kalamata, the prefectural capital and the power of including of over 70 football (soccer) clubs.  Basic organizations of the MFCA is the local football (soccer) championships in three divisions and the Messinia Cup in which features teams in prefectural divisions and the association-member of the MFCA enters the fourth division and its artistic honors of the prefectural association of the highest divisions, the first, the second and the third divisions.

The Messinia championships elevates into the fourth division

The Messinia Cup champions enters the Greek Cup.

The MFCA organizes championships and for children and from 2008, pro-junior 5x5.  It features games with other players from the prefectures and councils the Messinia Mixed which plays with clubs from the mixed from other unions.

The MFCA features annual honors and glass rewards to the three best scorers and the three best teams with the highest points fair play from every category.

In the entire games of the divisions, the MFCA teams owes to use particularly the three players under 19, without trying to participate for only players under 19.

Categories

In the 2008-09 season, the MFCA championship by category features the clubs:

First division

One of the 16 teams.  The championship enters the fourth division.  Three and four teams relegates analogously with the amount of the prefectural points of a team  to return from the fourth division.

Apollon Petalidi
Miltiadis Pyrgos Trifyllia
Kyparissia FC
Fares FC
Sperchogeia
Tsiklitiras Pylos
Aias Kalamatas
Panthouriakos
Apollon Kalamata
Papaflessas Chora
Ethnikos Meligala
Methoni
Doriefs Dorio
Olympiakos Kalamata
Iraklis Kalamata
Omonoia Kalamata

Second division

For two of the fourteen teams.  It enters the first two teams to the first division.  It relegates three from every club as much as it remains 28 teams again.  The number tries to influence from the Messinian teams which returns from the fourth division.

Papaflessas Amfia
Panionios Kalamata
Verga AU
Patista Kalamata FC
Pamissos Arios
Panathinaikos Kalamata
Astera Valira
Doxa Kalamata
Avia AU
Paneviakos
Foinikounta
Asprochoma
Prasina Poulia Kalamata
Niki Plati
Asteras Arfara (2009-10 season)
Chatzi
Chandrinaikos
Manessi
Achilleas Avrami
Androussa
Atromitos Platy
Akritas Koroni
Mani FC
PAO Kalamata
Neromylos
Astera Mikromani
Iraklis Kalamata

Third division

This division features 23 teams.  6 teams with the highest points enters the third division (of the first three from ever club) the five remaining with the lowest points returns from the fourth division.

Skala FC
Ermis Kalamatra
Kallithea
Ethea AU
Olympiakos Analypsi
Diagoras Kopanaki
Aspropoulia FC
Gargaliani AU
Amfithea
Anagenissi Paralia
Akadimia Patista 2006
Astera Chiliochori
Ikaros Kalamata
AEK Kalamata
Kalo Nero
Longa
Stenossia
Nestor Pylos (founded in 1958)
Thyella Paralia
Diodia
Dimakeios Taygetos
Pyravlos Zevgolateio
Leontes Kalamata

Teams in the highest divisions

In the power of the MFCA it had 6 teams which in the 2008-09 season features those in the highest categories:

Second division:
Kalamata FC
None in the third division
Fourth division:
Messinakos
Erani Filiatra
Asteras Arfara (did not take part), relegated to the prefectural second division
Pamissos Messini
Telos Agras Gargaliani

Messinia Cup

Cup winners

1985: Miltiadis -
1986: Pamisos Messini -
1987: Messiniakos
1988: Messini FC -
1989:
1990: Miltiadis - Erani Filiatra: 2-1
1991: Anagenissi Paralia - Messini FC: 1-0
1992: Apollon Kalamata - Erani Filiatra: 2-1
1993: Messini FC - Erani Filiatra: 2-1
1994: Pamissos Messini -
1995: Erani Filiatra – Omonoia Kalamata: 3-0
1996: Pamissos Messini -
1997: Telos Agras Gargaliani  -
1998: Telos Agras Gargaliani  -
1999: Apollon Kalamata  -
2000: Asteras Arfara - Sperchogeia : 4-2
2001: Erani Filiatra - Messiniakos: 3-2
2002: Erani Filiatra – Pamissos Messini: 2-0
2003: Erani Filiatra – Pamissos Messini: 0-0 (3-2 pen.)
2004: Erani Filiatra – Sperchogeia: 1-0
2005: Miltiadis - Apollon Petalidi: 0-0 (5-4 pen.) 
2006: Asteras Arfara - Papaflessas Chora: 6-0
2007: Miltiadis - Pamisos Messini: 4-0
2008: Apollon Petalidi - Telos Agras Gargaliani: 1-0
2009: Erani Filiatra - Messiniakos: 1-0
2010: Erani Filiatra -
2011: Pamisos Messini -
2012: Erani Filiatra' -

Performance by club

 Women's clubs 

In the women's clubs features two teams:

 Messiniakos
 Niki 1991 Kalamata

 The veteran clubs 

From the 2004-05 season, the Messinia Football Clubs Association runs a veterans championships.  In the 2008-09 season, in the 5th veterans, it has 11 clubs: Apollon Kalamata, Kalamata FC, Messiniakos, Prasina Poulia Kalamata, Omonoia Kalamata, Thyella Paralia, Pamisos Messini, Atromitos Platy, Ethnikos Meligala, Kostis Tsiklitirias Pulos and Apollon Petalidi.

SourcesEleftheria Kalamata'' (16-6-2008), p 6

References

External links
 http://www.espmes.gr 

Association football governing bodies in Greece
Messenia